Blowpipe may refer to:
 Blowpipe (missile), a man-portable surface-to-air missile
 Blowgun (also called a blowpipe or blow tube) is a simple weapon in which a missile, such as a dart, is blown through a pipe
 Blowpipe (tool), used to direct streams of gases into any of several working media
 Blowpipe (Transformers), several Transformers characters